Nekromantik 2: Die Rückkehr der Liebenden Toten (The Return of the Loving Dead) (stylized as NEKRomantik 2) is a 1991 German horror film directed by Jörg Buttgereit and a sequel to his 1988 film Nekromantik. The film is about necrophilia, and was quite controversial and was seized by authorities in Munich 12 days after its release, an action that had no precedent in Germany since the Nazi era.

Setting
The film is set in Berlin, shortly after the German reunification. The apartment of Monika is set in the former East Berlin, with exterior shots depicting a burnt-out Trabant and crumbling building façades, while other locations of the film, such as the meeting place of Mark and his friend, are set in the former West Berlin.

Plot
The film begins where the first one left off, with a flashback to Robert "Rob" Schmadtke's suicide (Daktari Lorenz), whose corpse Monika (Monika M.) retrieves from a church's graveyard after the opening credits. This introductory scene establishes that Monika is not simply the local gravedigger. The body snatcher is depicted with a particularly feminine appearance: red nail polish on her fingernails, pencil skirt and polka dot blouse. Monika apparently evades notice while carrying Rob's corpse into her apartment, where she unwraps him from his body bag. Images of tabloid headlines inform viewers of the source of Monika's knowledge of Rob and his activities. Meanwhile, Mark (Mark Reeder) heads to his as-yet-unspecified job, and the film then cuts back to a scene of Monika undressing Rob. Mark's job is thereupon revealed to be dubbing porn films, and this scene foreshadows the next, in which Monika has sex with Rob's corpse. Betty (Beatrice Manowski), Rob's ex-girlfriend from the previous film, is then briefly introduced as she discovers, to her disappointment, that Rob's grave has already been robbed.

Monika fails to have an orgasm and the sex scene ends with her running to the bathroom. She is disgusted, and about to vomit. The implication is that "the spirit is willing, but the flesh is weak". Once Monika has cleaned Rob's corpse, she takes photos with him using her camera's self-timer. She is seen cuddling the corpse in the photos. Mark, meanwhile, makes plans to meet a friend (Simone Spörl) at the movie theater. Mark's friend, however, is late, and Mark offers his ticket instead to Monika, a stranger who happens to be passing by. Monika and Mark hit it off and soon go on a carnival date, after which point Monika decides to break up with Rob. She is apparently attempting to live a normal life with a real boyfriend.

She tearfully saws the corpse of Rob into pieces and putting them into garbage bags, saving just his head and genitals. She then disposes of the garbage bags. She keeps the genitals in her fridge. The next scene depicts Monika and Mark in her apartment. She is showing him a photograph album, containing images of several dead relatives, sometimes in their coffins. The two end up having sex, though the experience is less than satisfying for Monika. Mark subsequently spends the night at Monika's, and, through a morning raid of her refrigerator, Mark discovers Rob's genitals. This discovery, combined with Monika's desire to photograph Mark in positions that make him appear dead, plants doubts in his mind about the relationship. He does not dare express these doubts to her. Consequently, Mark consults first his perennially tardy friend and then a drunk in a bar regarding his relationship with the perverse Monika.

Soon thereafter, Monika and her fellow necrophiliac friends have a movie night at Monika's apartment, suggesting that she is part of a network of people with similar interests. The film they are watching depicts the dissection of a seal. Positioned on the coffee table during their viewing experience is Rob's severed head. Mark unexpectedly drops by, bringing a pizza. This brings the movie night to a premature end, with Monika hiding the severed head and her friends leaving. When Mark insistently asks what Monika and her friends had been doing, she reluctantly shows him the seal video. The images both disgust and enrage Mark, who says it's perverse to watch such a thing for fun, leading to a quarrel.

The couple later speak on the phone and makes plans to meet at Monika's and discuss the matter. In the meantime, Monika makes a trip to the ocean, where she contemplates what course of action to take. When Mark arrives the next day, they have makeup sex, during which Monika severs Mark's head and replaces it with Rob's severed head. In addition, Monika is finally shown climaxing, which suggests that she has chosen the correct lover.

Finally, in the last scene, a doctor congratulates Monika on her pregnancy.

Soundtrack
The soundtrack, by Hermann Kopp, Daktari Lorenz, John Boy Walton and Peter Kowalski, is neither ironic nor campy, but rather is intended to generate genuine emotional response. The serious intent of the film in general is made clear in an interview in which Buttgereit discusses an audition in which actors performed the love scene with Rob's corpse: "Though they were all quite willing, none of them took it as seriously as we did."

Furthermore, although he is commenting on the soundtrack to the original Nekromantik, Christian Keßler's observations about that film's soundtrack resonate in the context of the second film as well: "The excellent soundtrack by Lorenz, Hermann Kopp, and John Boy Walton accentuates this [Rob's unusual, charnel domestic circumstances] with a romantic leitmotif composed for a single piano that makes the gruesome environment seem like a protective case, shielding Robert from the reality that so torments him."

Production
The shooting of the film occurred in September and October 1990. The editing of the film was completed by April 1991. The film was originally planned to last 85 minutes, but the print shown at the Berlin premiere lasted 111 minutes. It was soon shortened to 104 minutes, after removing "unimportant bits and pieces" from various scenes. Reportedly, no scene of the film was completely removed. David Kerekes commented that it could stand to be further shortened, since several sequences were, in his view, protracted and tedious.

The film within a film in the movie theater scene is a parody of My Dinner with Andre (1981). In the original film, two men sit at a dinner table and philosophize for two hours. The parody film  has a nude man and woman (Wolfgang Müller and Käthe Kruse) sitting outdoors, eating numerous boiled eggs and conversing on topics of ornithology. The parody film is shot in black-and-white, maintaining an authentic look for an art film. This sequence contains most of Nekromantik 2'''s dialogue. Buttgereit included this parody film as a tribute to a "fascinating piece of film making".

The role of Monika was not written with a specific actress in mind. The creators of the film placed an advertisement in a magazine, looking for a person for the role. There were about 40 applicants, but none was deemed satisfying. Eventually Franz Rodenkirchen recruited Monika M., a woman who he met by chance in a movie theater. He was initially impressed that this woman was a fan of Lucio Fulci films. He then observed her for a while, and liked the way she walked and expressed herself. He decided to approach her and offer her the role. According to Monika, she was already familiar with the name of Buttgereit, having already seen Der Todesking (1989).

The role of Mark required the actor Mark Reeder to smoke, but he had no intention to take up smoking for the sake of art. So, the creators revised the role to have Mark as a non-smoker.

Critical response
According to Randall Halle, the film can be seen as a romance film with a twist.

While some accuse the Nekromantik films of being "little more than 'disappointingly witless' and 'morbidly titillating' attempts 'to disgust the most jaded conceivable audience', there have been positive reviews as well. Film critic Christian Keßler writes that "Jörg Buttgereit is the only person in Germany who manages to dedicate himself to these darkest of subjects with this much charm". Literature and film critic Linnie Blake argues that these movies are not only more thematically complex and technically sophisticated than is popularly supposed, but share a set of artistic and ideological concerns more usually associated with the canonic authors of the Young German Cinema and the New German Cinema of the turbulent years of the 1960s and 1970s".

Though speaking of the first Nekromantik, in which a "beer-guzzling, oompah-listening fat-man" accidentally kills a man picking apples, Linnie Blake's comments are also relevant to Nekromantik 2 when she writes "As Buttgereit makes clear, then, it is neither Rob nor Betty [the protagonists of the first Nekromantik] who has transformed the young apple-picker into a corpse. This has been accomplished by an ostensibly morally upstanding member of society who subsequently disappears from view, unpunished for his crimes. Buttgereit's mission, it seems, is to embrace that corpse, and in so doing to raise the question originally posed by Alexander Mitscherlich, Director of the Sigmund Freud Institute in Frankfurt, as to why the collapse of the Third Reich had not provoked the reaction of conscience-stricken remorse one might logically expect; why, in Thomas Elsaesser's words, 'instead of confronting this past, Germans preferred to bury it'.

Confiscation
In June 1991, Munich police confiscated the film, leading an interviewer to ask Buttgereit "How does it feel to be Germany's most wanted filmmaker?" Buttgereit responded: "I'm not sure how to feel. At the moment I'm afraid of a police raid. But I'm not really proud of it, if that's what you mean." The reason for the film's seizure was that it purportedly glorified violence. According to Buttgereit, "The thing that people find offensive about Nekromantik 2 is that it doesn't accuse Monika." At a different point in the interview, Buttgereit states, "It was very important to me that the audience is on Monika's side, even with her doing these terrible things." In 1993, however, the film was officially deemed "art", thanks to an exhaustive expert opinion by film scholar Knut Hickethier. However, Buttgereit says, "the big shops are still afraid to sell my DVDs."

The official charge against the film was that it was "glorifying violence". The police confiscated the print of the film shown in the Werkstattkino (Workshop Cinema) in Munich. Then the local prosecutor handed the print to the authorities of Berlin, which placed the film in the index for seized videos; videos which all known copies had to be confiscated, while the police started searching for the negatives. Being caught in possession of a copy was illegal in its own right. The confiscation was actually the fourth one to occur in the Werkstattkino over a period of two years. Starting in the mid-1970s, the movie theater had depicted many controversial films, including hardcore pornography, horror films and propaganda films dating to World War II. The censoring authorities in Munich seemed to have a particular grudge for the movie theater, which seems to have influenced the fate of Nekromantik 2. In July 1992, there was also a police raid in the residence of Manfred O. Jelinski, and the policemen confiscated anything remotely related to the banned film.

The film's banning was actually questionable, because no trial or hearing over the fate of the film had actually occurred. The confiscation and banning was based solely on the decisions of the censoring authorities.

Release
The film premiered in June 1991 in Germany on VHS. Cult Epics released the film in a limited edition on February 10, 2015 on DVD and Blu-ray Disc in the United States. The Blu-ray featured extensive bonus features, including: a new introduction by Jörg, an audio commentary, trailers of Jörg Buttgereit's films, a "Making Of" documentary, still photo gallery, new short films by Jörg, and the score (original and live) of Nekromantik 2.

Legacy
Buttgereit continued the story of Nekromantik 2'' with artist Martin Trafford in a comic book. The comic was released on German label Weissblech Comics.

Sources

References

External links
 
 
 Jelinski & Buttgereit Online (German and English)

1991 films
1991 horror films
German horror films
1990s English-language films
1990s German-language films
Films directed by Jörg Buttgereit
Films set in a movie theatre
Films set in Berlin
Films shot in Germany
Necrophilia in film
Obscenity controversies in film
German sequel films
1990s German films